Robert Dibble (15 November 1882 – 1963) was an English rugby union international who represented England from 1906 to 1912. He also captained the side in 1909 and 1912.

Early life
Robert Dibble was born in 1882 in Bridgwater. His father was Robert Dibble (1848–1938) his mother Fanny Boon (1848–1930). Despite being illiterate, his father rose to be the respected manager of the local brickworks.

Rugby union career
Dibble played as a forward for the Bridgwater RFC rugby club and made his international debut for England against Scotland on 17 March 1906 at Inverleith.

He took part in the 1908 British Lions tour to New Zealand and Australia, playing three games.

Of the 22 matches he played for England or the British Lions he was on the winning side on 11 occasions. He played his final match for England on 16 March 1912 at Inverleith in the Calcutta Cup (Scotland vs England) match.

References

1882 births
1963 deaths
Bridgwater & Albion RFC players
England international rugby union players
English rugby union players
Newport RFC players
Rugby union players from Bridgwater
Rugby union forwards
British & Irish Lions rugby union players from England